Wilson Falor "Bud" Flagg (October 25, 1938September 11, 2001) was a United States Navy Rear Admiral. On October 15, 1993, he was censured for failing to prevent the 1991 Tailhook conference scandal, effectively ending any chance for further career advancement. He and his wife Darlene were killed on board American Airlines Flight 77 during the September 11 attacks of 2001.

Early life
Wilson Falor Flagg was born October 25, 1938 While in high school, Flagg, known by the nickname "Bud", met his future wife, Darlene Ellen "Dee" Embree (October 22, 1938 - September 11, 2001). They became sweethearts, and married after Flagg graduated  from the United States Naval Academy in Annapolis, Maryland in June 1961.

Career
Flagg attended flight school in Pensacola, Florida, and became a Navy pilot in 1962. He served on active duty from 1961 to 1967, including three tours as a fighter pilot in Southeast Asia during the Vietnam War. After leaving active duty, he continued flying the F-8 Crusader, logging more than 3,200 flight hours. He subsequently embarked upon dual careers as an American Airlines captain and an officer in the Naval Reserve.

His decorations included the Distinguished Service Medal, the Meritorious Service Medal, the Air Medal and the Navy Commendation Medal with Combat V.

In 1987 he became a rear admiral, and was posted at The Pentagon, where he was one of the top officers for the Naval Reserve. In 1993, two years after the 1991 Tailhook Association scandal, he was one of three top officials who received letters of censure for failing to stop extensive incidents of sexual harassment at the association's Las Vegas convention.

Flagg retired from the Navy in 1995 as a rear admiral and from American Airlines in 1998, although at the time of his death, he still had an office at the Pentagon, for instances in which the Pentagon contacted him for technical advice.

Personal life and death

The Flaggs lived in Mississippi, California, and Connecticut before settling in the early 1990s to Daybreak Farm, a Black Angus beef cattle farm in Millwood, Virginia. They also owned a home in Las Vegas, and Dee Flagg was active in Grace Evangelical Lutheran Church in Winchester, Virginia, and the Greenway Garden Club in Clarke County. Both were members of the Blue Ridge Hunt. 

During the September 11 attacks in 2001, the Flaggs and their friend, Barbara G. Edwards, were on board American Airlines Flight 77, heading to a family gathering in California. They were killed when it crashed into the Pentagon. The Flaggs were both 62, and were survived by their sons, Marc and Michael, and four grandchildren.

At the National 9/11 Memorial, Flagg, his wife and Edwards are memorialized at the South Pool, on Panel S-70.

References

External links

1938 births
2001 deaths
United States Naval Academy alumni
United States Naval Aviators
United States Navy personnel of the Vietnam War
Recipients of the Air Medal
United States Navy rear admirals (upper half)
Recipients of the Navy Distinguished Service Medal
American Airlines Flight 77
Victims of the September 11 attacks
American terrorism victims
Terrorism deaths in Virginia
People murdered in Virginia
Burials at the United States Naval Academy Cemetery